WSTG (95.9 FM. "Star FM") is a hot adult contemporary formatted broadcast radio station licensed to Princeton, West Virginia, serving Mercer County in West Virginia and Bland County in Virginia. WSTG is owned and operated by Princeton Broadcasting, Inc.

External links
Star 95 Online

STG